The 24th Annual Nickelodeon Kids' Choice Awards was held on April 2, 2011, at the Galen Center at the University of Southern California in Los Angeles, California, US's University Park neighborhood due to renovations disallowing use of traditional venue Pauley Pavilion until at least 2013. Jack Black returned as host for the third time since 2006. The 2011 telecast was the first Kids' Choice Awards to take place in the month of April since 2006, as the previous four Kids' Choice telecasts from 2007 to 2010 were held on the last Saturday in March. Nominees were announced on February 10, 2011, for twenty categories. During the show, the Big Green Help Award was presented to Justin Timberlake, an honor given each year. More than 200 million record-breaking votes were cast for this year's 20-category awards.

Musical performances during the awards telecast included Big Time Rush, who performed their single "Boyfriend" from their gold certified debut album B.T.R. with a surprise appearance by Snoop Dogg, who was slimed at the end of the song.  (This marked the second time a Nickelodeon act performed during the actual Kids' Choice telecast after The Naked Brothers Band in 2008); The Black Eyed Peas and Willow Smith also performed during the awards telecast, and each sang a medley of some of their 2 latest hit singles.

For the third year in a row, the award show was preceded by a Countdown to Kids' Choice! pre-show telecast, which aired live from 7 to 8 p.m. ET as wraparound segments during regularly scheduled programming; the pre-show was hosted by BrainSurge host Jeff Sutphen, Victorious cast member Daniella Monet, iCarly cast member Noah Munck, and recording artist Aaron Fresh. Train performed their 2010 hit single "Hey, Soul Sister" during the pre-show; Victoria Justice, who was also a presenter during the awards telecast, performed the single "Beggin' on Your Knees" from the upcoming soundtrack to her Nickelodeon series Victorious during the pre-show. The song was also featured during a new episode of Victorious, also titled "Beggin' on Your Knees", which aired immediately following the awards at 9:35 p.m. ET/PT.

Like the previous year, Nickelodeon's sister channels TeenNick and Nicktoons suspended regular programming during the 95-minute duration of the award show, allowing viewers to see the awards. A portion of Figueroa Street and Jefferson Boulevard fronting Galen Center was blocked off for the "orange carpet", a stage, and the grandstand for fans to watch the broadcasting of the pre-show. On April 1, Nickelodeon reported the slime was stolen as part of the April Fool's Day joke.

As with previous years, voting took place online via the (no longer active) program's official webpage (www.nick.com/kca11) and mobile site (m.nick.com/kca11) beginning on March 7, along with an iPhone/iPad application made specifically for the awards as introduced in the previous year. In addition, the network's Facebook page also allowed voting via the Facebook accounts of 'fans' of the channel for the first time.

Presenters and performers, and stunts for KCA 2011

Hosts
 Jack Black
Pre-show hosts: Aaron Fresh, Daniella Monet, Noah Munck, and Jeff Sutphen

Presenters
 Russell Brand
 Nick Cannon
 Miranda Cosgrove
 Rosario Dawson
 Randy Jackson
 Joe Jonas
 Victoria Justice
 Kim and Kourtney Kardashian
 Heidi Klum
 Jane Lynch
 Taylor Momsen
 Cory Monteith
 Keke Palmer
 Rico Rodriguez
 Jason Segel
 Steven Tyler
 Sofia Vergara
 Shaun White
 The Big Show

Performers
 Big Time Rush – "Boyfriend" (feat. Snoop Dogg)
 The Black Eyed Peas – "I Gotta Feeling" with Jack Black, "The Time (Dirty Bit)", "Just Can't Get Enough"
 Willow Smith – "21st Century Girl", "Whip My Hair"
 Victoria Justice – "Beggin' on Your Knees" (pre-show)
 Train – "Hey, Soul Sister" (pre-show)

Announcer
 Tom Kenny

Special appearances
 Britney Spears only appeared in the skit when she was calling security on Po from Kung Fu Panda.
 Jim Carrey appeared at the end of the show in a giant hot-air balloon.
 Po the Panda Bear from Kung Fu Panda (voiced by Jack Black) appeared in the audience at least three times performing in mini-skits with Britney Spears.
Blu and Jewel from Rio (voiced by Jesse Eisenberg and Anne Hathaway) appeared backstage at the awards.

Nicktoon appearances
The following characters (except Po) announce certain unseen awards between commercials.
Kung Fu Panda 2 and Kung Fu Panda: Legends of Awesomeness – Po
The Penguins of Madagascar – The Penguins and King Julien, announcing Favorite Butt-kicker
T.U.F.F. Puppy – Agents Dudley Puppy and Kitty Katswell, announcing Favorite Animated Movie
Fairly OddParents – Cosmo, Wanda and Poof (in CGI), announcing Favorite Male Singer
Planet Sheen – Sheen and Nesmith, announcing Favorite Book.
Rio – Blu and Jewel (not Nicktoons but to promote their movie), announcing Favorite Female Singer
Monkey Quest – Monkeys, announcing Favorite Cartoon, Favorite TV Actor, and Favorite Video Game
Fanboy & Chum Chum – Fanboy and Chum Chum, announcing Favorite Male Athlete

Winners and nominees
Winners are listed first, in bold. Other nominees are in alphabetical order.

Movies

Television

Music

Sports

Miscellaneous

Events within the show

Slime stunts
A giant monster truck jumps over a 50-foot Nickelodeon blimp award into a pool of slime. Hosted by Big Show.

Slimed celebrities
In a pre-show promo, Miranda, Jennette, Nathan, Jerry, and Keke were slimed in slow motion.

 Jack Black – Jack Black was slimed near the end of the program during a special appearance by Jim Carrey, who himself was slimed while in a hot air balloon-shaped apparatus.
 Russell Brand – This was not a planned sliming, but Brand and Rico Rodriguez had slime flicked at them by audience members who were slimed by Johnny Depp, following his acceptance of his Favorite Movie Actor award.
 Nick Cannon – Collateral slime from Heidi Klum.
 Jim Carrey – Carrey made a special cameo appearance near the end of the program, and was slimed while in a hot air balloon-shaped apparatus. This is also his 2nd sliming since his big sliming at the 2003 KCA's.
 Johnny Depp – Johnny Depp was not slimed himself, though he slimed several young audience members during his acceptance of his Favorite Movie Actor award.
 Snoop Dogg – Snoop Dogg was slimed at the end of a performance of the single "Boyfriend" by Big Time Rush, in which the rapper also performed as well.
 Kaley Cuoco – During the Arm Fart Hall of Fame to help win the contest.
 Josh Duhamel – Duhamel was showered with slime while sitting on a throne, during his acceptance of the viewer-voted celebrity "Arm Fart Hall of Fame" award.
Jewel and Blu (animated, from Rio) – From backstage, someone spilled slime on Jewel. She shakes some slime off and landed on Blu's eyes, making him see a girl's blue high heel, mistaking him for Jewel, who jokingly leads him off to get his eyes checked.
 Heidi Klum – Heidi was slimed by an envelope intended to reveal the winner of the Favorite TV Actress award (which went to Selena Gomez for her role in the Disney Channel series Wizards of Waverly Place).
 Rico Rodriguez – This was not a planned sliming, but Rodriguez and Russell Brand had slime flicked at them by audience members who were slimed by Johnny Depp, following his acceptance of his Favorite Movie Actor award. Beforehand, Brand had "scolded" the audience for the mess caused by Depp's sliming.
 Jason Segel – Segel was slimed by co-presenter Jane Lynch (in an homage to a scene from the pilot episode of the Fox series Glee), in which Lynch dumped a cup filled with slime on Segel's head.
Po (animated, from Kung Fu Panda and Kung Fu Panda 2) – Jack Black sends down the slime on his character and Po shouted, "Awesome!" and returned to his ancient cartoon China, as stated by Jack Black.

References

Nominations

External links
 

Nickelodeon Kids' Choice Awards
Kids' Choice Awards
Kids' Choice
Kids' Choice Awards
2011 in Los Angeles
Television shows directed by Beth McCarthy-Miller